Afonso Paulo Martins da Agra (born 11 April 1973), known as Martins, is a Portuguese retired footballer who played as a midfielder.

Club career
Born in Póvoa de Varzim, Martins family emigrated to France when he was very young, and he first played professionally with AS Nancy, spending three seasons at the club. In 1995–96 he returned to Portugal, signing with Sporting CP.

Martin's tenure with the Primeira Liga side was an inconsistent one: he was a starter during his first years but, towards the end, was often demoted to the reserves, and participated very little in the 2000 and 2002 championship conquests (no games whatsoever in the latter, as he was left without a place in the squad and only trained separately).

Martins finished his career in June 2007 at the age of 34, after spells with Moreirense FC, Vitória S.C. and lowly F.C. Lixa. He did not have a club in the 2005–06 campaign.

International career
Martins played for the Portugal national team at under-21 level, also appearing at the 1996 Olympic Games in Atlanta where he scored both goals in the 2–0 win over Tunisia in the first game, as the country eventually finished fourth.

Honours
Sporting
Primeira Liga: 1999–2000
Taça de Portugal: 2001–02
Supertaça Cândido de Oliveira: 1995

References

External links

1973 births
Living people
People from Póvoa de Varzim
Portuguese footballers
Association football midfielders
Ligue 1 players
Ligue 2 players
AS Nancy Lorraine players
Primeira Liga players
Segunda Divisão players
Sporting CP footballers
Sporting CP B players
Moreirense F.C. players
Vitória S.C. players
F.C. Lixa players
Portugal under-21 international footballers
Olympic footballers of Portugal
Footballers at the 1996 Summer Olympics
Portuguese expatriate footballers
Expatriate footballers in France
Portuguese expatriate sportspeople in France
Sportspeople from Porto District